Teresa Vaill (born November 20, 1962) is a female racewalker from the United States. She was born in Torrington, Connecticut.

Vaill set her personal best in the women's 20 km race walk event (1:33:23) on April 1, 2001, at a meet in Manassas, Virginia.  She remains an active competitor, winning numerous masters championships and placing in the USA National Championships (Open Division) as recently as 2018.

Her twin sister Lisa Vaill was also an international racewalker, and marathon runner.

Personal bests
10 km: 45:02 min – Gothenburg, 7 August 1995
20 km: 1:33:23 hrs – Manassas, Virginia, 1 April 2001 -

International competitions

References

External links

Tilastopaja biography

1962 births
Living people
People from Torrington, Connecticut
Track and field athletes from Connecticut
Twin sportspeople
American female racewalkers
Olympic track and field athletes of the United States
Athletes (track and field) at the 2004 Summer Olympics
Pan American Games track and field athletes for the United States
Athletes (track and field) at the 1995 Pan American Games
21st-century American women